Panagiotis Khatzistathis (born 2 May 1952) is a Greek athlete. He competed in the men's long jump at the 1976 Summer Olympics.

References

1952 births
Living people
Athletes (track and field) at the 1976 Summer Olympics
Greek male long jumpers
Olympic athletes of Greece
Place of birth missing (living people)
Mediterranean Games silver medalists for Greece
Mediterranean Games medalists in athletics
Athletes (track and field) at the 1967 Mediterranean Games